Lines of Color is a live tribute album by the Gil Evans Project which is led by Ryan Truesdell. It was recorded in concert at the Jazz Standard in New York in May 2014. It earned the group a 58th Annual Grammy Awards nomination for Best Large Jazz Ensemble Album.

Reception
Dan Bilawsky of All About Jazz rated the album 4.5 out of 5 stars. The website's Dan McClenaghan gave Lines of Color 5 out of 5 stars.

Track listing
 "Time of the Barracudas" (Gil Evans and Miles Davis) - 8:54
 "Davenport Blues" (Bix Beiderbecke) - 6:19
 "Avalon Town" (Grant Clarke and Nacio Herb Brown) - 4:13
 "Concorde" (John Lewis) - 7:49
 "Cant We Talk It Over" (Ned Washington and Victor Young) - 4:13
 "Gypsy Jump" (Gil Evans) - 3:19
 "Greensleeves" (traditional) - 4:35
 "Easy Living Medley" - 9:41"Easy Living" (Leo Robin and Ralph Rainger), "Everything Happens To Me"(Hoagy Carmichael and Johnny Mercer) and "Moon Dreams"(Johnny Mercer and Chummy MacGregor)
 "Just One of Those Things" (Cole Porter) - 5:26
 "Sunday Drivin'" (C J Norwood and John Benson Brooks) - 3:24
 "How High the Moon" (Morgan Lewis and Nancy Hamilton) - 3:48

Track listing adapted from the iTunes Store

Personnel

Ryan Truesdell – conductorWoodwindsAlden Banta – bassoon/bass clarinet/baritone sax
Brian Landrus – baritone/clarinet/bass clarinet
Dave Pietro – alto/flute/alto flute/clarinet
Donny McCaslin – /flute/clarinet
Jesse Han – flute
Jessica Aura Taskov – flute
Scott Robinson – tenor/clarinet/bass clarinet
Steve Kenyon – flute/clarinet
Steve Wilson – soprano/alto/alto flute/clarinet
Tom Christensen – alto flute/oboe/English hornBrassAugie Haas – trumpet
Greg Gisbert – trumpet
Mat Jodrell – trumpet
Marshall Gilkes – trombone
Ryan Keberle – trombone
George Flynn – bass trombone
Adam Unsworth – French horn
David Peel – French horn
Marcus Rojas – tubaRhythmFrank Kimbrough – piano
James Chirillo – guitar
Jay Anderson – bass
Lewis Nash – drumsPlus'
Lois Martin – viola
Wendy Gilles – voice

References

2015 live albums
Live jazz albums
Tribute albums